Vekhovstvo (vekhovtsy) was a philosophical and socio–political trend in the Russian intellectual environment at the beginning of the 20th century, which got its name from the program collection Vekhi (1909). The initiator of the publication of the latter was Mikhail Gershenzon.

Among the authors of the collection were four former Marxists: Nikolai Berdyaev, Sergei Bulgakov, Pyotr Struve and Semyon Frank, who took the position of Christian religiosity, rejecting Marxism as a purely economic doctrine that does not answer the fundamental questions of human existence.

The first essentially Vekhovstvo's collection was the collection «Problems of Idealism» (1902), the final one was «From the Depths» (1918).

Ideas
The Vekhi philosophers called on the intelligentsia, which they accused of the turmoil of 1905–1907, to abandon the worldview built on collectivism, worship of the people (populism), nihilism ("apostasy from the state"), irreligion and preaching political radicalism. The positive program of Vekhovstvo is based on the recognition of the independence of the human subject, on the recognition of personal responsibility for what is happening – on the basis of universal Christian values.

Ideas of the main representatives
An outstanding thinker and former Marxist Nikolai Berdyaev became one of the leading Vekhi members. He, like the rest of his associates, was engaged in the analysis of the place of Russia in the changing world, its ideas, the search for ways of the country's development. The philosopher called the era of the beginning of the 20th century the "New Middle Ages", since, in his opinion, mankind again entered the era of irrationalism, and the collectivist values that prevailed in society again suppressed the freedom of the individual. In addition, the philistine worldview of the West, according to Berdyaev, led to the destruction of the highest values, the barbarization of society. The philosopher was also interested in the "Russian Idea", that is, the essence of the Russian soul and the destiny of Russia. He argued that Russia combines the features of the West and the East, but he did not put it above other countries. Berdyaev argued that, according to God's plan, the country should be such a combination of Eastern and Western ideas, in which their unity, some ideological integrity would be observed, but in reality the "Russian Idea" of that era was presented as a simple disorderly confusion of the features of these two worlds.

The thinker also deeply analyzed the worldview of the Russian person, opposing it to the Western one. If the European worldview could eventually come to discipline, then the all–embracing "breadth" of the Russian soul was incapable of such restraint. Berdyaev found a manifestation of such a feature, for example, in the fact that within the framework of Russian thought it was quite possible to combine many opposites, an example of which could be the revolutionaries, who, however, promoted radically conservative views. Thus, a Russian person is not characterized by a rigid categorization of certain concepts.

The philosopher and Orthodox priest Sergei Bulgakov took a strong anti–Western position. He criticized the Western ideology of Marxism, expressing, among other things, the non–trivial idea that this doctrine was only a transposition of Jewish ideas into the plane of economic science. A socialist society, in his opinion, would promote progress only in the material sphere, without caring about the spiritual component. However, Bulgakov cannot be called a Slavophile in the full sense, since he also criticized Russian statehood, because there were too many Eastern features in it that still had to be revised.

Criticism
Vekhovstvo was sharply criticized by the leader of the Bolsheviks, Vladimir Lenin, who branded the collection as an "encyclopedia of liberal apostasy" in December 1909: "Vekhi is a continuous stream of reactionary slop poured on democracy. It is clear that Novoye Vremya's publicists, Rozanov, Menshikov and Alexander Stolypin, rushed to kiss Vekhi. It is clear that Anthony Volynsky was delighted with this work of the leaders of liberalism".

References

External links
Controversy Around "Vekhi"

Vekhovtsy